Events from the year 1531 in Sweden.

Incumbents
 Monarch – Gustav I

Events

 - Laurentius Petri is appointed the first Lutheran Arch Bishop of Sweden. 
 - Wedding between the King and Catherine of Saxe-Lauenburg.
 - Olaus Petri writes the first Lutheran church service in Sweden.
 - The third of the Dalecarlian Rebellions begins.

Births

Deaths

References

 
Years of the 16th century in Sweden
Sweden